Zdislava is a market town in Liberec District in the Liberec Region of the Czech Republic. It has about 300 inhabitants.

History
The first written mention of Zdislava is from 1364. In the 1970s, it was joined to neighbouring Křižany. Since 1990, Zdislava has been a separate municipality again.

References

External links

Market towns in the Czech Republic